George Payne (22 August 1921 – 6 April 1987) was an English footballer who played as a goalkeeper for Tranmere Rovers and Northwich Victoria. He made 467 appearances for Tranmere.

References

1921 births
1987 deaths
Footballers from Liverpool
Association football goalkeepers
English footballers
Tranmere Rovers F.C. players
Northwich Victoria F.C. players
English Football League players